Robert Thomas (R. T.) Jones (14 October 1874 – 15 December 1940) was a Welsh quarryman, trade unionist and Labour Party politician.

Born in Blaenau Ffestiniog, Jones started work in the slate quarries when was 13. His first language was Welsh. As a young man he was influenced by R. Silyn Roberts (1871–1930), the Welsh poet, social reformer and early ILP supporter, who was Minister of the Calvinistic Methodist chapel at Tanygrisiau in Blaenau Ffestiniog from 1905 to 1912.

He was elected at the 1922 general election as the Member of Parliament (MP) for Caernarvonshire, having unsuccessfully contested the seat in 1918. He was defeated at the 1923 general election by the Liberal Party candidate Goronwy Owen, and although he stood again for Caernarvonshire in 1924 and 1929 he was never returned to the House of Commons.

Jones served on the TUC General Council from 1921 to 1932.  From 1908 to 1933, he was General Secretary of the North Wales Quarrymen's Union.

References

External links

Portrait of Robert Thomas Jones in the National Portrait Gallery, London.

1874 births
1940 deaths
People from Blaenau Ffestiniog
Welsh trade unionists
UK MPs 1922–1923
Welsh Labour Party MPs